Portfolio.com was a website published by American City Business Journals that provideed news and information for small to mid-sized businesses (SMB). It was previously the website for the monthly business magazine Condé Nast Portfolio, published by Condé Nast from 2007 to 2009.

Portfolio.com had several interactive features, including "BizWatch," which had updates on companies and executives from selected news sources.

History 
Portfolio.com's April 2007 launch by Condé Nast was heavily reported on due, in part, to its large estimated budget reported to be between $100 million and $125 million (covering multiple years of operation), and to the boldness of the publisher to launch a business magazine at a time when similar magazines such as BusinessWeek, Business 2.0, Forbes, and Fortune were struggling to sell advertising space.

In October 2008, the magazine reduced its staff by 20 percent, and changed to publishing only 10 times per year. The stand-alone website, portfolio.com, was merged with other Condé Nast Web sites, with advertising sales for the site handled by Wired Digital.

The magazine announced its closing on April 27, 2009. A sister company, American City Business Journals, took over the website. American City Business Journals is a division of Advance Publications and publishes 40 weekly newspapers about business in local communities and their companion websites. In June 2012 American City Business Journals re-branded the website to Upstart Business Journal; the website closed in 2016.

Staff
J. Jennings Moss was Portfolio.com's editor. He had been a Managing Editor at FoxNews and Senior Editor-News Manager for ABCNews among other roles.

As a print magazine, Portfolio'''s 100-person editorial staff was led by editor-in-chief Joanne Lipman. During her 22-year tenure at The Wall Street Journal, Lipman was involved in the founding of the Weekend Journal, as well as the Personal Journal. The Managing Editor was Jacob Lewis, the Design Director was Robert Priest, the Articles Director was Kyle Pope.

Content
Portfolio.com published regular business news stories and comprehensive findings of American City Business Journals’ research studies, which were analyzed by Godfrey Phillips, Vice President for Research at American City Business Journals.

For the first time in 2010, Portfolio.com published the results of American City Business Journals’ “SMB Insights: The Business of Brands,” which rated more than 200 business brands across seven key attributes to determine overall rankings of brand strength. Additional studies included information on investing and brand-preferences by SMB owners, how SMB owners are using the Internet to improve their businesses  and how SMB are increasingly leveraging wireless devices.Portfolio.com'' launched the U.S. Uncovered series, a monthly collection of exclusive, in-depth analyses of trends, produced by G. Scott Thomas, a nationally recognized demographer.

References

External links
 

2007 establishments in the United States
Business magazines published in the United States
Monthly magazines published in the United States
Internet properties established in 2007
Magazines established in 2007
Magazines disestablished in 2009
Defunct magazines published in the United States
Online magazines published in the United States
Online magazines with defunct print editions